James William Elias Davies,  (1913 – 27 June 1940) was an American combat fighter pilot who was the first American-born airman to die in combat in World War II. Davies was shot down and killed on 27 June 1940.

Although born in the United States, his family moved to Wales before the start of the war. As such, he appears in official records as being British.

Royal Air Force service
Davies joined the Royal Air Force in 1936 and by 1939 was flying the Hawker Hurricane monoplane fighter with No. 79 Squadron RAF at RAF Biggin Hill. The squadron was soon in action after the outbreak of World War II and by the end of June 1940 Davies had already claimed six German aircraft shot down and two shared to become a flying ace. He was Mentioned in Despatches for gallantry and devotion to duty in the execution of air operations in June 1940, and was due to be presented with the Distinguished Flying Cross (DFC) from the King on 27 June when he was sent as an escort to protect six aircraft on a reconnaissance mission to the French port of St Valery. The three Hurricanes were attacked by three Messerschmitt Bf 109s over the English Channel; one of the Hurricanes escaped and one pilot bailed out into the sea, but Davies was killed.

His name is inscribed on the Air Forces Memorial at Runnymede for airmen with no known grave. The citation for the award of his DFC was published in the London Gazette the day following his death, reading:

References

1913 births
1940 deaths
American World War II flying aces
Aviators from New Jersey
Aviators killed by being shot down
Royal Air Force personnel killed in World War II
Recipients of the Distinguished Flying Cross (United Kingdom)
Royal Air Force officers
Victims of aviation accidents or incidents in 1940
Victims of aviation accidents or incidents in international waters
American emigrants to Wales
American Royal Air Force pilots of World War II
Military personnel from New Jersey